Parthiv Ajay Patel (born 9 March 1985) is a former Indian professional cricketer, wicketkeeper-batsman, and was a member of the Indian national cricket team. He is a left-handed batsman and played for Gujarat in domestic cricket. Having lost a finger at the age of 9, he initially found it hard to keep wickets, but after enough practice, he was used to it. When Parthiv played for the Indian team in 2002, he became the youngest wicket-keeper to represent a country in Tests. With the emergence of MS Dhoni as wicketkeeper-batsman, Parthiv Patel's chance of becoming the first choice keeper for India faded away.

In December 2020, Patel announced his retirement from all forms of cricket. After his retirement, Patel joined Mumbai Indians as a Talent Scout.

Domestic career 
Patel led the Gujarat side in the 2016–17 Ranji Trophy. Beating Odisha and Jharkhand in the quarterfinal and semifinal, the team reached the final for only the second time. In the final in January, they met defending champions Mumbai in Indore. Patel scored 90 in the first inning and 143 in the second and helped beat Gujarat to win its first Trophy. Patel's 143 was the highest in a successful chase in a Ranji Trophy final. The win also made Gujarat the first team and Patel the first captain to have won all three major domestic titles.

In July 2018, he was named as the captain for India Green for the 2018–19 Duleep Trophy. In October 2019, he was named as the captain of India B for the 2019–20 Deodhar Trophy.

Indian Premier League
Patel was auctioned in the inaugural Indian Premier League (IPL) to Chennai Super Kings. He used to be a regular in the team and opened with the former Australian opener Matthew Hayden. He did not keep wicket as the Indian wicketkeeper as captain MS Dhoni was in the team. For the fourth season, he was signed by Kochi Tuskers Kerala. On 16 May, it was announced that Parthiv will be leading the Kochi Tuskers Kerala for the rest of the 2011 Indian Premier League. As a result of the termination of Kochi Tuskers franchise, Parthiv along with the other players from the franchise was once again auctioned for the 2012 Indian Premier League season. He was picked by Deccan Chargers for $1m
During the 2012 IPL Trading Window. Parthiv was picked up by Sunrisers Hyderabad in 2013 and by Royal Challenger Bangalore in 2014. Patel was signed by Mumbai Indians for the 2015 IPL as an opening batsmen.

In January 2018, he was bought by the Royal Challengers Bangalore in the 2018 IPL auction.

International career 

Parthiv debuted in the year 2002 against England at Trent Bridge at 17 years and 153 days to become Test Cricket's youngest wicketkeeper. He had replaced the injured Ajay Ratra and eclipsed the record previously held by Pakistan's Hanif Mohammed (17 years and 300 days). He played out an hour in the match while batting and hence saved India from defeat.  However, with the emergence of Dhoni and poor wicketkeeping, he was sidelined for a few matches in 2004.

On 23 November 2016, Parthiv Patel was called up as a replacement for the regular wicket-keeper Wriddhiman Saha who had a thigh strain, for the third Test (at Mohali) of the India-England home series. He played his first Test in eight years, having missed 83 Test matches between appearances.

Patel made his ODI debut against New Zealand in January 2003. He was selected in the Indian squad for the 2003 Cricket World Cup but did not play any games, with Rahul Dravid being used as a makeshift wicket-keeper to allow the use of an extra batsman or bowler. With this policy in place, Patel only made intermittent appearances in ODIs, usually when Dravid was injured or being rested (in full or from wicket-keeping duties). He played 13 ODIs in a two-year span, and during an interrupted career managed only an average of 14.66 and a top-score of 28 and was dropped thereafter. Parthiv returned to the Indian team in 2010 in the 4th and 5th Odi vs New Zealand. He celebrated this moment by hitting two back to back half centuries. Later on he was called up for replacing injured Sachin Tendulkar in India tour South Africa .

Tour of West Indies 2011
With wicket-keeper captain MS Dhoni rested for the tour along with several seniors such as Sachin Tendulkar, Zaheer Khan, he was entrusted with the job of wicket-keeping in the tour along with Wriddhiman Saha. In the lone T20I match played in the tour, he made his T20I debut at the Queen's Park Oval at Port-of-Spain. He opened the batting along with another left-handed debutante Shikhar Dhawan and made a 26 from 20 balls. In the second ODI against West Indies he scored 56 not out.

England tour of India 2016
With wicket-keeper Wriddhiman Saha injured, Parthiv was called to test team duty for the third test in Mohali.  He proved the selectors' decision was right with two good innings including an unbeaten 67 runs from 54 balls in the second innings which led India to victory.

One of the Indian cricketers to play T20 match in 2005
Parthiv Patel, along with Robin Singh and Rohan Gavaskar played their first T20 match in 2005. This was the early phase of t20 format. But the first Indian cricketer to play a t20 match was Dinesh Mongia. He played his debut match in July 2004.

References

External links
 
 Parthiv Patel  at Wisden
 Parthiv Patel Royal Challenger
Unlucky cricketer at Cricket and Cricketer

1985 births
Living people
India One Day International cricketers
India Test cricketers
India Twenty20 International cricketers
Cricketers at the 2003 Cricket World Cup
Gujarat cricketers
Chennai Super Kings cricketers
West Zone cricketers
Kochi Tuskers Kerala cricketers
India Green cricketers
India Red cricketers
Deccan Chargers cricketers
Sunrisers Hyderabad cricketers
Cricketers from Ahmedabad
Gujarati people
Royal Challengers Bangalore cricketers
Mumbai Indians cricketers
Wicket-keepers